Konrad Cramer (1888—1963) was a German-born American painter. He was trained at the Academy of Fine Arts in Karlsruhe, and he emigrated to the United States in 1911. A naturalized U.S. citizen, he is "often credited as being an important link between German and American modernism in art."

References

1888 births
1963 deaths
People from Würzburg
German emigrants to the United States
German male painters
American male painters
20th-century American painters
20th-century American male artists